Jürgen Glas (born 1956) is a retired German breaststroke swimmer who won a silver medal in the  medley relay at the 1973 World Aquatics Championships. In 1973 and 1975 he won four national titles in total and twice finished in second place.

As of 2000 he was still competing in swimming in the masters category.

References

1956 births
Living people
German male swimmers
German male breaststroke swimmers
World Aquatics Championships medalists in swimming
21st-century German people
20th-century German people